"Queen of Pop" is a compilation album of songs recorded by on the Wizard Record label between 1975 and 1979 by Australian singer-songwriter Marcia Hines. The album was released in November 2000 by BMG records.

The title pays tribute to the "Queen of Pop" award she won three consecutive years between 1976 and 1978.

Track listing 
 "You"  (Tom Snow) – 3:17
 "What I Did for Love (Marvin Hamlisch, Edward Kleban) – 3:10
 "Shining" (Jill Wagner, Robie Porter) – 3:42
 "Moments" (Rick Springfield) – 3:26
 "Jumpin' Jack Flash (Mick Jagger, Keith Richards) – 3:18
 "I Just Don't Know What to Do With Myself" – 3:07
 "I Don't Know How to Love Him" (Tim Rice, Andrew Lloyd Webber) – 3:49
 "Fire and Rain" (James Taylor) – 4:46
 "Don't Let the Grass Grow" (David Buskin) – 2:59
 "April Sun in Cuba" (Paul Hewson, Marc Hunter) – 3:46
 "Where Did We Go Wrong" (Burt Bacharach, Hal David) – 4:06
 "Something's Missing (In My Life)" (Paul Jabara) – 4:41
 "Music Is My Life" (Robie Porter) – 2:10
 "Let the Music Play" (Bias Boshell) – 4:27
 "I've Got the Music in Me" (Bias Boshell) – 4:06
 "Imagination" (Robie Porter) – 3:51
 "From the Inside" (Artie Wayne) – 3:36
 "Empty" (Robie Porter) – 2:37
 "Believe in Me" (Robie Porter) – 1:43
 "(Until) Your Love Broke Through" (Bias Boshell) – 3:19

Release history

References 

Marcia Hines compilation albums
2000 compilation albums